Speegle is a surname. Notable people with this surname include:

 Cliff Speegle (1917–1994), American football player
 Jean Speegle Howard (1927–2000), American actress
 Nick Speegle (born 1981), American American football player